Bacari Djaló (born 12 August 1983 in Bissau) is a Bissau-Guinean former footballer who played as a forward.

External links

1983 births
Living people
Sportspeople from Bissau
Bissau-Guinean footballers
Association football forwards
Liga Portugal 2 players
Segunda Divisão players
G.C. Alcobaça players
S.C. Pombal players
F.C. Felgueiras players
F.C. Famalicão players
Vitória S.C. players
AC Vila Meã players
F.C. Penafiel players
G.D. Ribeirão players
GD Bragança players
Académico de Viseu F.C. players
C.D. Pinhalnovense players
Juventude Sport Clube players
Caldas S.C. players
Guinea-Bissau international footballers
Bissau-Guinean expatriate footballers
Expatriate footballers in Portugal
Expatriate footballers in Luxembourg
Bissau-Guinean expatriate sportspeople in Portugal
Bissau-Guinean expatriate sportspeople in Luxembourg